is a town located in Shiribeshi Subprefecture, Hokkaido, Japan.

As of September 2016, the town has an estimated population of 2,286 and a population density of 12 persons per km². The total area is 189.51 km².

Geography
Route 230 and Route 276 cross each other in Kimobetsu. Nakayama Pass is on the eastern of the town.

The name derived from Ainu word "kim-o-pet", meaning "The river in the mountain".
 Mountains: Mount Yōtei, Mount Shiribetsu
 Rivers: Shiribetsu River, Kimobetsu River

Neighboring municipalities
 Shiribeshi Subprefecture
 Kyogoku
 Rusutsu
 Makkari
 Ishikari Subprefecture
 Minami-ku, Sapporo
 Iburi Subprefecture
 Date

Climate
Due to its mountainous location, Kimobetsu has a humid continental climate (Koppen Dfb). Summers are generally warm and wet, while winters are cold and extremely snowy.

History
1897: Makkari Village split off from Abuta Village (now Toyako Town).
1901: Kaributo Village (now Niseko Town) was split off from Makkari Village.
1906: Makkari Village became a Second Class Village.
1910: Makkari Village was transferred from Muroran Subprefecture (now Iburi Subprefecture) to Shiribeshi Subprefecture.
1917: Kimobetsu Village (now town) was split off from Makkari Village.
1946: Kimobetsu Village became a First Class Village.
1952: Kimobetsu Village became Kimobetsu Town.

Education
 Junior high school
 Kimobetsu Junior High School
 Elementary school
 Kimobetsu Elementary School
 Suzukawa Elementary School

See also
 Shikotsu-Tōya National Park

References

External links

Official Website 

Towns in Hokkaido